The High Commission of Belize in London is the diplomatic mission of Belize in the United Kingdom. It shares the building with the High Commission of Antigua and Barbuda.

References

External links
 Official site

Belize
Diplomatic missions of Belize
Belize–United Kingdom relations
Buildings and structures in the City of Westminster
Marylebone